Maria Arnal (born 1987) is a Spanish singer. Born to a musical family, she started writing songs and playing the guitar at 18. She studied literature and translation at university, and combined this with various temporary jobs, such as working as an usher at the Teatre Lliure. After breaking her femur in 2014 she left the job and later studied singing at the Badalona School of Modern Music.  There she performed and continued her training with Marc Sempere, promoter of the collective Compartir Dóna Gustet, and with Jasmin Martorell, a vocal coach who had been a disciple of Montserrat Caballé. At the musical level, Arnal bases her background on the oral tradition of the Iberian Peninsula. According to the artist, she wants to approach tradition from the perspective of free culture in the digital age.

She has published three albums, with the musical accompaniment of Marcel Bagés on the electric guitar.

Discography
 Remescles, acoples y melismas (EP, 2015)
 Verbena (EP, 2016)
 45 cerebros y 1 corazón (LP, 2017)
 CLAMOR (LP, 2021)

References

1987 births
Singers from Catalonia
Living people
People from Badalona
21st-century Spanish singers